Wasp, released by teen idol Shaun Cassidy in 1980, was his fifth and final studio album.  In an attempt to salvage a sinking pop career, Cassidy recruited Todd Rundgren to help "reinvent" his music career. Members of Rundgren's group Utopia also played on the record, and the work had a decidedly "new wave" feel.

The majority of tracks featured on Wasp were cover songs. The album featured a version of David Bowie's song, "Rebel Rebel," in which Cassidy included a passage from The Crystals' "He's a Rebel." Other covers included The Who's "So Sad About Us," Ian Hunter's "Once Bitten, Twice Shy," the Talking Heads' "The Book I Read," The Animals' 1965 hit "It's My Life," and The Four Tops' 1966 hit "Shake Me, Wake Me." All of the other songs were written by Rundgren and various members of his band. Unlike his previous four albums where he wrote at least one song, Cassidy was given a co-writing credit on "Cool Fire."

The reinvention of teenybopper Cassidy as an edgy new wave artist was not enough to capture the attention of audiences.  The album was Cassidy's second album not to chart on Billboard, effectively ending his pop music career. Cassidy would score a final hit in Europe in 1989 with the standalone single "Memory Girl."

The album was released on CD in 2012 on Curb Records.

Track listing

"Rebel, Rebel" (David Bowie)
"Cool Fire" (John Wilcox, Roger Powell, Shaun Cassidy, Todd Rundgren)
"The Book I Read" (David Byrne)
"Pretending" (Todd Rundgren)
"Shake Me, Wake Me" (Holland–Dozier–Holland)
"It's My Life" (Roger Atkins, Carl D'Errico)
"So Sad About Us" (Pete Townshend)
"Wasp" (Todd Rundgren)
"Selfless Love" (Todd Rundgren)
"Once Bitten, Twice Shy" (Ian Hunter)

Personnel
Shaun Cassidy - vocals
Todd Rundgren - guitar, bass, drums, saxophone
Roger Powell - keyboards, synthesizer, backing vocals
John "Willie" Wilcox - drums, backing vocals
Kasim Sulton - bass on "Selfless Love"

Shaun Cassidy albums
1980 albums
Albums produced by Todd Rundgren
Warner Records albums